Kelani River-Peliyagoda Waterdrome, also called Sri Lankan Waterdrome is an open water aerodrome facility for use by seaplanes on the Kelani River, in the Peliyagoda suburb of Colombo, Sri Lanka

Services

Special flights were operated by SriLankan AirTaxi from the waterdrome to Hambantota during the 2011 Cricket World Cup. This is the closest airport to the city of Colombo, Sri Lanka.

References

Airports in Sri Lanka